Mícheál Ó hEidhin, Irish musician and teacher, and schools inspector of music, Primary/Postprimary born 1938. He died on 29 January 2012.

A native of Derroe-Rossaveel, County Galway, Mícheál Ó hEidhin was born into a musical family. Graduating in science, he studied music at University College Cork under Aloys Fleischmann, choral development with Pilib Ó Laoghaire, worked as a music inspector in Galway VEC, and initiated Comhaltas Ceoltóirí Éireann's teaching diploma in 1980.

He was music director for RTÉ promgrammes Bring down the Lamp and Comortas – Cabaret"In song and in seory", "Comórtas" and an adjudicator for Oireachtas and Slogadh competitions since 1969. He was instrumental in setting up a grades syllabus in traditional music for Comhaltas Ceoltóirí Éireann and the Royal Irish Academy of Music in 1998.

Publications
 Cas Amhran
 Amhran do Cholaisti
 Ceol don Chor
 "Déan Rince"

References
 Mícheál Ó hEidhin, Fintan Vallely, in The Encyclopaedia of Ireland, ed. Brian Lalor, Gill & Macmillan, Baile Átha Cliath, 2003.

Irish schoolteachers
Irish writers
Musicians from County Galway
1938 births
2012 deaths